Bapatla West (rural) is a village in Guntur district of the Indian state of Andhra Pradesh. It is located in Bapatla mandal of Tenali revenue division.

Geography 

Education 

As per the school information report for the academic year 2018–19, the village has a total of 20 schools. These include 2 government, 6 Zilla/Mandal Parishad and 12 private schools.

See also 
Bapatla East
List of villages in Guntur district

References 

Villages in Guntur district